McArthurGlen Group is a privately-owned and founder-led company, which develops and manages designer outlet malls.

Background
McArthurGlen originated as a private company in North America, part of the Vancouver based McLean Group. It opened and ran factory outlet shopping centres. Following a $180 million share issue in 1993 it became McArthur/Glen Group. McArthurGlen UK Ltd was also set up in 1993, based in London and managing designer shopping outlets across North America, United Kingdom, and Western Europe.

On July 9, 2015, McArthurGlen opened its first outlet in North America at Vancouver Airport.

Locations

North America

United Kingdom
Sites in the UK:

Continental Europe

References

Notes

Citations

External links
 McArthurGlen Designer Outlets
 McArthurGlen Group
 About McArthurGlen Designer Outlets

Shopping centres in the United Kingdom
Outlet malls in England